Cold Squad is a Canadian police procedural drama television series that aired on CTV from 1998 to 2005. Created by Matt MacLeod, Philip Keatley and Julia Keatley, it stars Julie Stewart as Sgt. Ali McCormick, the lead investigator on a team of homicide detectives who reopen long-unsolved (or "cold") cases, using present-day forensic technology and psychological profiling to help crack them.

Cold Squad was produced by Keatley MacLeod Productions and Alliance Atlantis in association with CTV Television Network, with the participation of the Canadian Television Fund (Canada Media Fund). Cold Squad is the first prime time national series produced out of Vancouver, British Columbia. With seven seasons and 98 episodes it became the longest-running prime time drama series on Canadian television.

Julie Stewart directed and starred in three episodes of the series: "The Nanny" (No. 66), "Back in the Day" (No. 79), and "Mr. Bad Example" (No. 93).

Episode run time is 43 minutes (including opening title sequence and closing credits roll).

Series overview

Episodes

Season 1 (1998)

Season 2 (1998–99)

Season 3 (1999–2000)

Season 4 (2000–01)

Season 5 (2001–02)

Season 6  (2002–03)

Season 7 (2004–05)

References

External links
 
 
  Cold Squad at ShareTV
 
  Cold Squad at Zap2it
  Cold Squad Season 1 DVD cover (Netherlands)
  Cold Squad Season 2 DVD cover (Netherlands)

Lists of Canadian drama television series episodes
Lists of crime television series episodes
Lists of crime drama television series episodes
Lists of mystery television series episodes